Joe Sova (born May 8, 1988) is an American professional ice hockey defenseman. He is currently playing with the Quad City Storm of the SPHL.

On March 19, 2011, Sova was signed as a free agent by the New Jersey Devils to an entry-level contract.

On January 20, 2012, the New Jersey Devils traded Sova to the Carolina Hurricanes, along with New Jersey's 4th round choice in the 2012 NHL Entry Draft (Jaccob Slavin), in exchange for Alexei Ponikarovsky.

On August 28, 2013, Sova signed as a free agent to return to the Kalamazoo Wings of the ECHL. After two seasons with the Wings Sova extended his stay in re-signing for a potential third campaign in Kalamazoo. However, prior to the 2015–16 season, Sova was traded by the Wings to the Tulsa Oilers on October 15, 2015.

References

 http://thesphl.com/view/thesphl/news/news_492111

External links

1988 births
Living people
Alaska Nanooks men's ice hockey players
Albany Devils players
American men's ice hockey defensemen
Charlotte Checkers (2010–) players
Chicago Wolves players
Florida Everblades players
Kalamazoo Wings (ECHL) players
Omaha Lancers players
People from Berwyn, Illinois
Reading Royals players
San Francisco Bulls players
Sioux City Musketeers players
Toledo Walleye players
Tulsa Oilers (1992–present) players
Waterloo Black Hawks players